"Buses and Trains" is the debut single of Australian pop band Bachelor Girl. Released on 18 June 1998 as the first single from the band's debut album, Waiting for the Day (1998), the song peaked at number four on the ARIA Singles Chart and remains the band's highest-charting single. It was also a hit in New Zealand, where it reached number six and earned a Gold certification. Outside Australia, "Buses and Trains" reached number 29 in Sweden, number 35 in Iceland, and number 65 in the United Kingdom.

At the APRA Music Awards of 1999, the song was nominated for Most Performed Australian Work and won Song of the Year. At the ARIA Music Awards of 1999, it was nominated for Highest Selling Single but lost to "Jackie" by BZ featuring Joanne.

Music video
The video features Tania recording a snapshot of her life to send to her mum. The entire video is viewed from the TV's point of perception, with Tania doing various things correlating with the lyrics in the song as she sings. The view occasionally turns the side where James Roche can be seen playing an instrument. It ends with Tania ejecting the tape and writing 'Dear Mum' on an envelope before slipping the tape inside.

Track listings
Australian and Japanese CD single
 "Buses and Trains"
 "This Must Be Love"
 "Buses and Trains" (Roadside mix)

European CD single
 "Buses and Trains" – 3:42
 "This Must Be Love (Like It or Not)" – 4:02

Charts

Weekly charts

Year-end charts

Certifications

Release history

References

1998 debut singles
1998 songs
APRA Award winners
Arista Records singles
Bachelor Girl songs
Bertelsmann Music Group singles
Songs about buses
Songs about trains